WBLQ may refer to:

 WBLQ (AM), a radio station (1230 AM) licensed to Westerly, Rhode Island, United States
 WSUB-LP, a radio station (96.7 FM) licensed to Ashaway, Rhode Island, United States, which used the call sign WBLQ-LP from 2005 to 2009
 WKIV, a radio station (88.1 FM) licensed to Westerly, Rhode Island, United States, which used the call sign WBLQ from 1997 to 2005
 WMNP, a radio station (99.3 FM) licensed to Block Island, Rhode Island, United States, which used the call sign WBLQ from 1988 to 1996
 WJET (AM), a radio station (1400 AM) licensed to Erie, Pennsylvania, United States, which used the call sign WBLQ from 1986 to 1988